Piccadilly Incident is a 1946 British drama film directed by Herbert Wilcox and starring Anna Neagle, Michael Wilding, Coral Browne, Edward Rigby and Leslie Dwyer. Wilcox teamed his wife Anna Neagle with Michael Wilding for the first time, establishing them as top box-office stars in five more films, ending with The Lady with a Lamp in 1951. Wilding was third choice for leading man after Rex Harrison and John Mills.

Plot
During an air-raid on Piccadilly, Chief Wren Diana Fraser, who is on active duty with the Women's Royal Naval Service, meets Captain Alan Pearson, a Royal Marines officer on sick leave after the evacuation from Dunkirk. He invites her for a drink at his house - they dance and fall in love. Impulsively, he proposes to her and they marry.

Alan is posted to North Africa and Diana to Singapore. As Singapore falls to the Japanese, she is evacuated, but the ship in which she is travelling is attacked and she is presumed drowned. However, she and four other passengers survive, including Bill Weston, a Canadian sailor who loves her.

Two years later, they are rescued after their boat is spotted by an American aeroplane. Fraser returns home to find that her husband has remarried to an American Red Cross nurse, Joan, and they have a son. She is devastated and flees the house after meeting the wife.

Diana approaches Alan backstage at a Navy show. She pretends that the marriage meant little to her and that she has another man with whom she became involved when stranded on the island. The theatre is bombed; Alan is wounded but Diana dies in hospital. Before her death she confesses her lies and they both declare their love for each other. Later, a judge decides that Alan and Joan must remarry, but the son will be unable to inherit the family title.

Cast
Anna Neagle as Diana Fraser
Michael Wilding as Captain Alan Pearson
Frances Mercer as Joan Draper
Michael Laurence as Bill Weston
Coral Browne as Virginia Pearson
A. E. Matthews as Sir Charles Pearson	
Edward Rigby as Judd	
Brenda Bruce as Sally Benton	
Leslie Dwyer as Sam
Maire O'Neill as Mrs. Millgan
Reginald Owen as Judge	
Michael Medwin as Radio Operator	
Roger Moore as Guest Sitting at Pearson's Table (uncredited)

Production
Herbert Wilcox made the film as a follow up to I Live in Grosvenor Square (1945). He hoped to use the same leads, Anna Neagle and Rex Harrison, but the success of Grosvenor Square saw Harrison offered a contract with 20th Century Fox. Wilcox offered the role to John Mills, who turned it down. He accepted Michael Wilding reluctantly at the suggestion of Wilding's agent, but once he saw Wilding and Neagle play their first scene together, he put Wilding under a personal long-term contract.

Reception
Piccadilly Incident was the second most popular film at the British box office in 1946, after The Wicked Lady. According to Kinematograph Weekly the 'biggest winner' at the box office in 1946 Britain was The Wicked Lady, with "runners up" being The Bells of St Marys, Piccadilly Incident, The Road to Utopia, Tomorrow is Forever, Brief Encounter, Wonder Man, Anchors Away, Kitty, The Captive Heart, The Corn is Green, Spanish Main, Leave Her to Heaven, Gilda, Caravan, Mildred Pierce, Blue Dahlia, Years Between, O.S.S., Spellbound, Courage of Lassie, My Reputation, London Town, Caesar and Cleopatra, Meet the Navy, Men of Two Worlds, Theirs is the Glory, The Overlanders, and Bedelia.

It was voted the best British film of 1946 at Britain's National Film Awards. Neagle's performance meant she was voted Best Actress of the year by the readers of Picturegoer magazine.

Though The New York Times thought the film demonstrated "the British are quite as capable as the Americans of unconvincing direction, ill-considered writing and tedious acting", critic Godfrey Winn wrote "In Piccadilly Incident is born the greatest team in British Films"; Leonard Maltin wrote "good British cast gives life to oft-filmed plot"; Allmovie called the film "a weeper deluxe"; and the Radio Times concluded that the film "effectively opens the tear ducts".

References

External links
Piccadilly Incident at BFI Screenonline
Piccadilly Incident at IMDb

Review of fil at Variety

1946 films
British black-and-white films
1946 drama films
Films directed by Herbert Wilcox
British drama films
1940s English-language films
1940s British films